Cercle Proudhon (French for Proudhon Circle) was a national syndicalist political group in France. The group was inspired by Georges Sorel, Charles Maurras and a selective reading of anarchist theorist Pierre-Joseph Proudhon.

History
Founded on December 16, 1911, by national syndicalist disciples of Georges Sorel, Georges Valois and Édouard Berth, the group was described as "founded by nationalists, and initially addressed only to them". The organisation began as informal meetings consisting of about twenty people on average, mainly monarchists and syndicalists who were associated with the right-wing monarchist group Action Française. The main speakers at these meetings were Valois, Berth, monarchist militant Henri Lagrange and nationalist philosopher Gilbert Mayor. French historian Géraud Poumarède describes the Circle's ambition as to "convert trade unionists to the monarchy".

Despite the group's close association to Sorel he was initially hostile to the group stating that he feared the Circle would make "young people less able to understand Proudhon". Charles Maurras was also wary of the group describing them in his book, L’Action française et la religion catholique (1913): "The French who met to found the Circle Proudhon are all nationalists. The boss they chose for their assembly made them meet other French, who are not nationalists, who are not royalists, and who join them to participate in the life of the Circle and the writing of Cahiers. The initial group includes men of different origins, different conditions, who have no political aspirations in common, and who will freely expose their views in the Cahiers."

The Circle published a bulletin entitled Cahiers du Cercle Proudhon, and operated a bookstore owned by Valois named the La Nouvelle Librairie which is still open to this day.

Ideology

The first issue of Cahiers du cercle Proudhon appeared in January – February 1912 and included a Déclaration:

Berth and Valois had been brought together by Georges Sorel when he was planning a Nationalist and socialist-leaning journal La Cité française in 1910. This journal never appeared, except as heralded in a flyer entitled Déclaration de la Cité francaise signed by Sorel, Valois, Berth, Jean Variot, and Pierre Gilbert. However Variot quarrelled with Valois and went on to publish material with Sorel's support in L'Indépendence.

A controversial but influential book by Zeev Sternhell, Neither Right nor Left: Fascist Ideology in France, points to the Cercle Proudhon as a pre-existing laboratory for fascist ideas that would provide a bulwark for Nazi collaboration in Vichy.

Critique
Many anarchists rejected the Cercle Proudhon interpretation of Proudhon's works. In the October 1st, 1913 issue of The New Freewoman, American  Individualist Anarchist Benjamin Tucker argued that Cercle Proudhon purposely misrepresented Proudhon's views:

See also
 National syndicalism

References

 Allen Douglas. From Fascism to Libertarian Communism: George Valois Against the Third Republic. University of California Press (1993)  
 Bernard Lanza. Georges Valois Du Cercle Proudhon au Nouvel Age,
 Georges Navet.  Le Cercle Proudhon, 1911-1914 : entre le syndicalisme révolutionnaire et l'Action Française.  Paris : Ecole des hautes études en sciences sociales, 1987.  (Les Travaux de l'Atelier Proudhon ; 6). 
 Géraud Poumarède. Le Cercle Proudhon ou l'impossible synthèse.  Mil neuf cent (1994) Volume  12 Issue 12 pp. 51–86
 Jack J. Roth. "Revolution and Morale in Modern French Thought: Sorel and the Sorelians". French Historical Studies, Vol. 3, No. 2 (Autumn, 1963), pp. 205–223
 Zeev Sternhell. "Fascist Ideology", Fascism, A Reader's Guide, Analyses, Interpretations, Bibliography, edited by Walter Laqueur, University of California Press, Berkeley, 1976. pp 315–376.
 Zeev Sternhell.  Neither Right nor Left: Fascist Ideology in France, Princeton Univ. Press, California 
 Zeev Sternhell.  The Birth of Fascist Ideology, with Mario Sznajder and Maia Asheri, published by Princeton University Press, 1989, 1994

Primary sources
 Alain de Benoist (ed.) Cahiers du Cercle Proudhon. Avatar Editions (2007). 
 Cahiers du Cercle Proudhon (1 année 1912), Paris, Etienne Rivet, 1912.
 Cahiers du Cercle Proudhon, Seven issues under the direction  Henri Fortin, Paris, Etienne Rivet, 1912.
 Charles Maurras. Lorsque Proudhon eut les cent ans.  (1907).

Partial bibliography
Partial bibliography of Cahiers du Cercle Proudhon
 DARVILLE Jean. PROUDHON. in-Cahiers du Cercle PROUDHON, n°1, janvier-février 1912
 DARVILLE Jean/MAYREL Maurice. Analyses et critiques.–in-Cahiers du Cercle PROUDHON, n°3-4, mai-août 1912.
 DARVILLE Jean. Satellites de la ploutocratie.–in-Cahiers du Cercle PROUDHON, n°5-6, fin 1912
 GALLAND Pierre.PROUDHON et l'Ordre.–in-Cahiers du Cercle PROUDHON, n°1, janvier-février 1912
 LAGRANGE Henri.PROUDHON et l'Ordre européen.–in-Cahiers du Cercle PROUDHON, n°2, mars-avril 1912.
 LAGRANGE Henri.L’œuvre de SOREL et le Cercle PROUDHON. Précisions et prévisions.-in-Cahiers du Cercle PROUDHON, n°3/4, mai-août 1912 .
 LES VIII.Les démocrates et PROUDHON.–in-Cahiers du Cercle PROUDHON, n°1, janvier-février 1912 .
 MAIRE Gilbert. La philosophie de Georges SOREL.–in-Cahiers du Cercle PROUDHON, n°2, mars-avril 1912 .
 MARAND René. Grandes rectifications soreliennes.–in-Cahiers du Cercle PROUDHON, n°3-4, mai-août 1912 .
 MAYREL Maurice/ DARVILLE Jean. Analyses et critiques.–in-Cahiers du Cercle PROUDHON, n°3-4, mai-août 1912.
 VALOIS Georges. Pourquoi nous rattachons nos travaux à l'esprit proudhonien.-in-Cahiers du Cercle PROUDHON, n°1, janvier-février 1912.
 VALOIS Georges. Notre première année. Murmures et rumeurs dans la presse et dans le monde sur le cercle PROUDHON.–in-Cahiers du Cercle PROUDHON, n°3-4, mai-août 1912.
 VALOIS Georges.SOREL et l'architecture sociale.–in-Cahiers du Cercle PROUDHON, n°3-4, mai-août 1912.
 VALOIS Georges.L’Action Française, l'expérience POINCARÉ et le syndicalisme.–in-Cahiers du Cercle PROUDHON, n°5-6, fin 1912.
 VALOIS Georges. La bourgeoisie capitaliste.–in-Cahiers du Cercle PROUDHON, n°5-6, fin 1912.
 VALOIS Georges. La direction de l'œuvre proudhonienne et le cas HALÉVY.–in-Cahiers du Cercle PROUDHON, n°5-6, fin 1912.
 VALOIS Georges. Notre deuxième année. Transformation des Cahiers.–in-Cahiers du Cercle PROUDHON, n°5-6, fin 1912 .
 VINCENT Albert. Le bilan de la démocratie.–in-Cahiers du Cercle PROUDHON, n°2, mars-avril 1912.
 VINCENT Albert. La famille chez PROUDHON et dans la démocratie.–in-Cahiers du Cercle PROUDHON, n°3-4, mai-août 1912 .
 MAURRAS Charles.À Besançon.–in-Cahiers du Cercle PROUDHON, n°1, janvier-février 1912.

External links

 Cahiers du Cercle Proudhon (facsimiles)
 Centre d'histoire de Sciences Po Georges Valois (Alfred-Georges Gressent)
 New edition published by Avatar Editions

Political parties established in 1911
French Integralism
National syndicalism
Action Française
Proto-fascists
Syncretic political movements
1911 establishments in France